A Provincial Council (also sometimes translated literally as provincial deputation, Spanish: diputación provincial) is the administrator and governing body of a province of Spain. It is one of the entities that make up local government in Spain.
The Council is made up of a president, vice presidents, an executive committee and the plenary assembly of deputies.

Function 
The role of the Provincial Council is limited to:
 provide legal, economic and technical assistance and co-operation to municipalities, particularly those with more limited economic and managerial resources;
 coordinate municipal services in order to ensure the provision of compulsory minimum services;
 provide public services extending to several municipalities and to associations of municipalities (Spanish: comarcas and mancomunidades);
 promote provincial interests.

Similar functions are exercised by the cabildos in the Canary and Balearic Islands.

Fiscal arrangements 
Provincial Councils are funded with small portions of the income tax, value-added tax, payments from municipalities, some other minor taxes such as a levy a surcharge on the municipal business tax, and a motor vehicle tax. They can borrow if authorised by the State or their Autonomous Community and then only for  investment purposes.

By autonomous community 

There are provincial councils in the provinces of the autonomous communities of Galicia, Aragon, Catalonia, Valencian Community, Castile and León, Castilla-La Mancha, Extremadura, and Andalusia. Basque Country have what are known as diputaciones forales (English: chartered councils), while in the Canary and Balearic Islands there are cabildos and consejos insulares (island councils) which perform functions similar to those of provincial councils.

Autonomous communities with only one province (Asturias, Cantabria, Community of Madrid, Murcia and La Rioja) and the Chartered Community of Navarre, do not have deputations as the government of the region handles all such functions.

Election 

The deputies are elected from the general public by the municipal councillors (Spanish: concejales) that make up the province, not directly by the populace. 
The number of deputies are determined in proportion to the number of inhabitants in each of the judicial districts using the D'Hondt method. Each judicial district covers a number of municipalities. 

The number of deputies per province depends on population and is given as follows:

The only exception to this are the chartered deputations of the three Basque provinces, where the deputies are elected directly by the people via proportional representation.

The president is elected in the inaugural session of the Council from amongst their number. The president selects the vice presidents and the executive committee.

Criticism 
According to one academic, Provincial Councils have been, since their creation, the most controversial of Spain's public institutions. According to this criticism, they were neither conceived to serve the interests of the public nor for promoting provincial development. Their only concrete function in law is to support smaller municipalities. Purportedly they only serve the interests of political parties, by distributing paid positions to party members or their associates. This is because, indirectly elected, the deputies and office holders are in practice decided by the top officials in the larger political parties, the author says. Spain has declared itself not bound to the full extent by the requirement for direct elections of all local authorities. 

A senior bureaucrat has claimed that Provincial Councils are a superfluous and unnecessary layer of government.

A European report criticises the overlap in responsibilities between various government levels. 

A number of political parties have recently called for the abolition of Provincial Councils.

References

Bibliography